Élie Bertrand (1713–1797) was a Swiss geologist and naturalist.

Publications (selection) 
 Mémoires sur la structure intérieure de la terre (Heidegguer, Zurich, 1752).
 Essai sur les usages des montagnes, avec une lettre sur le Nil (Heidegguer, Zurich, 1754).
 Mémoires historiques et physiques sur les tremblemens de terre (Pierre Gosse junior, La Haye, 1757).
 Recherches sur les langues anciennes et modernes de la Suisse et principalement du pays de Vaud (C. et A. Philibert, Genève, 1758).
 
 
 Essai sur l'art de former l'esprit, ou Premiers élémens de la logique (G. Regnault, Lyon, 1764).
 Recueil de divers traités sur l'histoire naturelle de la terre et des fossiles (L. Chambeau, Avignon, 1766) Read online.
 Lettre à M. le Cte de Buffon... ou Critique et Nouvel essai sur la théorie générale de la terre, avec une notice du dernier discours de M. Pallas, sur la formation des montagnes, sur les changemens arrivés au globe, etc. (Besançon, 1782).

External links 
Auguste Bertholet, "Le 'Mémoire sur la vie de Monsieur Elie Bertrand' (1783), ou la construction de la postérité d’un 'grand homme' des Lumières helvétiques", Trouvailles Lumières.Lausanne, n° 6, juin 2021, url: https://lumieres.unil.ch/publications/trouvailles/6/.
Frank A. Kafker and Serena L. Kafker, The Encyclopedists as individuals: a biographical dictionary of the authors of the Encyclopédie, Studies on Voltaire and the eighteenth century, 1988.  
Recueil de divers traités sur l'histoire naturelle de la terre et de fossiles (1766) - fully digitized facsimile from Linda Hall Library
Description of Bertrand's work from a catalog of a 1984 exhibition about Theories of the Earth 1644-1830 at the Linda Hall Library (see paragraph at page bottom)
 
 Historique du fonds de la bibliothèque d’Yverdon
 

1713 births
1797 deaths
People from Orbe
18th-century Swiss geologists
Swiss naturalists
Contributors to the Encyclopédie (1751–1772)
Members of the Göttingen Academy of Sciences and Humanities